The Jiujiang dialect is a variety of Cantonese spoken in Jiujiang Town, in Nanhai District, Foshan, Guangdong. A few words differ from Standard Cantonese, but generally other Cantonese speakers can understand Jiujiang dialect without difficulty.

Here are some differences between the Jiujiang dialect and the Guangzhou dialect:

Notes

References
 

Cantonese language
Yue Chinese
Nanhai District